Blaž Janc (born 20 November 1996) is a Slovenian handball player who plays for FC Barcelona and the Slovenian national team. He is the older brother of fellow handball player Mitja Janc.

He participated at the 2016 Summer Olympics in Rio de Janeiro, in the men's handball tournament.

References

External links

1996 births
Living people
People from Brežice
Slovenian male handball players
Expatriate handball players
Olympic handball players of Slovenia
Handball players at the 2016 Summer Olympics
Expatriate handball players in Poland
Slovenian expatriate sportspeople in Poland
Slovenian expatriate sportspeople in Spain
Vive Kielce players
FC Barcelona Handbol players
Liga ASOBAL players
Youth Olympic gold medalists for Slovenia
Handball players at the 2014 Summer Youth Olympics
21st-century Slovenian people